The Djibouti women's national football team represents the country in international competitions. Football is organised by the Djiboutian Football Federation, with women's football formally organised in the country in 2002, and a national team was later created.

History

Background
The country became independent in 1977. The Djiboutian Football Federation was founded in 1977 and joined FIFA in 1994. Football is one of the most popular sports in the country. Women's football development in Africa has to deal with several challenges that impact the ability to develop a high level of play, including limited access to education, poverty amongst women in the wider society, and fundamental inequality present in the society that occasionally allows for female specific human rights abuses. When high level women's players are developed, many leave the country seeking greater opportunity in Northern Europe or the United States. Another issue facing women's football in Africa is that most of the money for the game does not come from national football federations but instead from FIFA.

By 1985, few countries had their own women's national football teams. Djibouti was no exception: women's football was not officially organised in the country until 2002 and then, only for players sixteen years and older. As of 2009, there were only eight women's clubs for these players in the country. There is a regional and national women's competition, which was established in 2007. The league provided the first opportunity for women outside the capital and major cities to play football. The country has a women's national team but has no youth teams, meaning no U17 or U20 teams. 12% of the money from the FIFA Financial Assistance Programme (FAP) is targeted at the technical development of the game, which includes women's football, sport medicine and futsal. This compares to 11% specifically set aside for men's competitions and 10% set aside for youth football. Between 1991 and 2010, there was no FIFA FUTURO III regional course for women's coaching. A FUTURO III regional course men's coaching workshop was hosted in 2008. In 2007, there was a women's football seminar held in the country. In 2007, there was a FIFA MA course held for women/youth football.

Performance
Between 1977 and April 2012, Djibouti women's national football team played in only one FIFA sanctioned match. It was played in Nairobi on 26 March 2006, with Kenya women's national football team winning 7–0, holding a lead of 4–0 over Djibouti at the half. The women's national team has not competed at the Women's World Cup. They played two non-sanctioned games, one in 2004 and one in 2005. In March 2012, the team was not ranked in the world by FIFA and did not formally exist.

Results and fixtures

The following is a list of match results in the last 12 months, as well as any future matches that have been scheduled.

Legend

2022
 

Results and Fixtures – Soccerway.com
globalsportsarchive

Coaching staff

Current coaching staff
update 14 April 2022

Manager history
 
 Hassan kako( 2022–)
   Mawlid Ali Beilleh(2021–2022)
 Samy Smaili (2020–2021)

Players

Current squad
 The following players were named in February 2022 for the 2022 Africa Women Cup of Nations qualification tournament.
 Caps and goals accurate up to and including 30 October 2021.

Recent call-ups
The following players have been called up to a Djibouti squad in the past 12 months.

Previous squads
CECAFA Women's Championship
2022 CECAFA Women's Championship squads

Records

 Active players in bold, statistics correct as of 2020.

Most capped players

Top goalscorers

Competitive record
 Champions   Runners-up   Third place   Fourth place

FIFA Women's World Cup

*Draws include knockout matches decided on penalty kicks.

Olympic Games

*Draws include knockout matches decided on penalty kicks.

Africa Women Cup of Nations

(The former format was amended as it did not comply with MOS:FLAG as discussed here)
*Draws include knockout matches decided on penalty kicks.

African Games

CECAFA Women's Championship

Honours

All−time record against FIFA recognized nations
The list shown below shows the Djibouti national football team all−time international record against opposing nations.
*As of xxxxxx after match against xxxx.
Key

Record per opponent
*As ofxxxxx after match against xxxxx.
Key

The following table shows Djibouti's all-time official international record per opponent:

See also

Sport in Djibouti
Football in Djibouti
Women's football in Djibouti
Djibouti women's national under-20 football team
Djibouti women's national under-17 football team
Djibouti men's national football team

References

External links
Association page at fifa.com

َArabic women's national association football teams
Djibouti women's national football team
African women's national association football teams